The Mulliner Book (British Library Add MS 30513) is a historically important musical commonplace book compiled probably between about 1545 and 1570, by Thomas Mulliner, about whom practically nothing is known, except that he figures in 1563 as modulator organorum (organist) of Corpus Christi College, Oxford. He is believed to have previously resided in London, where John Heywood inscribed the title page of the manuscript Sum liber thomas mullineri / iohanne heywoode teste. ('I am Thomas Mulliner's book, with John Heywood as witness.') A later annotation on the same page states that: T. Mulliner was Master of St Pauls school, but this has so far proved unsupportable. The provenance of the MS is unknown before it appears in the library of John Stafford Smith in 1776. After passing through the hands of Edward Francis Rimbault the MS was given to the British Museum in 1877 by William Hayman Cummings.

Contents
Of the 121 keyboard pieces over half are based on Catholic liturgical chants, and most of the rest are transcriptions of part songs and anthems, some twenty or so of which are secular. There are only two dance pieces and no variations. There are also nine pieces for the cittern, the earliest extant music for this instrument. The sixteen named composers represented are among the most important of the time, including Thomas Tallis (18 pieces), John Redford (35 pieces), John Blitheman (15 pieces), John Taverner (1 piece) and Christopher Tye (2 pieces). Nineteen pieces are unattributed.

See also

 The Dublin Virginal Manuscript
 My Ladye Nevells Booke
 Susanne van Soldt Manuscript
 Clement Matchett's Virginal Book
 Fitzwilliam Virginal Book
 Parthenia (music)
 Priscilla Bunbury's Virginal Book
 Elizabeth Rogers' Virginal Book
 Anne Cromwell's Virginal Book

Notes

Further reading
 The Mulliner Book edited by Denis Stevens. Musica Britannica vol. I, Stainer & Bell, London 1973. 
 Denis Stevens, The Mulliner Book: A Commentary (London n.d., 1952?).
 The Mulliner Book revisited – some musical perspectives and performance considerations. Gifford, Gerald, in The Consort, vol. 58, Summer 2002, pp 13-27.
 The Mulliner Book newly transcribed and edited by John Caldwell. Musica Britannica vol. I, Stainer & Bell, London 2011. .

External links
 Table of Contents for Stainer & Bell's Mulliner Book compilations
 
The Mulliner Book on the British Libraries Collection

Renaissance music
Books on English music
Compositions for organ
Compositions for keyboard
Renaissance music manuscript sources
16th-century books
British Library additional manuscripts